Affrica may refer to:

Affreca de Courcy, thirteenth-century member of the Crovan dynasty, wife of John de Courcy
Aufrica de Connoght, fourteenth-century Manx claimant